Abby Kane (born 4 August 2003) is a British Paralympic swimmer competing as a S13 classification swimmer, mainly in backstroke events.

Kane has Stargardt disease, a condition leading to progressive vision deterioration. In her first Paralympics, the 2016 Summer Paralympics in Rio de Janeiro, Kane won the silver medal in the 100m backstroke S13 event. She was the youngest member of ParalympicsGB at the 2016 Paralympics.

Since 2018 Abby has been training with North Ayrshire Swimming coached by Jess Wilkie.

References

2003 births
Living people
English female swimmers
S13-classified Paralympic swimmers
Swimmers at the 2016 Summer Paralympics
Medalists at the 2016 Summer Paralympics
Paralympic silver medalists for Great Britain
Visually impaired category Paralympic competitors
Paralympic medalists in swimming
Paralympic swimmers of Great Britain
People educated at Largs Academy
British female backstroke swimmers
Swimmers at the 2022 Commonwealth Games
Commonwealth Games competitors for Scotland
21st-century British women
British blind people